The 2014–15 Grand Canyon Antelopes men's basketball team represented Grand Canyon University during the 2014–15 NCAA Division I men's basketball season. This was head coach Dan Majerle's second season at Grand Canyon. This season was year 2 of a 4-year transition period from Division II to Division I. As a result, the Antelopes were not eligible to make the NCAA Tournament and did not participate WAC Basketball Tournament. However the Antelopes could compete in the NIT, CIT, or CBI tournaments should they be invited. They finished the season 17–15, 8–6 in WAC play to finish in a tie for second place. They were invited to the CollegeInsider.com Tournament where they lost in the first round to Northern Arizona.

Previous season 
The Antelopes finished the season 15–15, 10–6 in WAC play to finish in third place. They were invited to the CollegeInsider.com Tournament where they lost in the first round to Pacific.

Broadcast Coverage
For the second consecutive season, all of the Lopes home games are broadcast exclusively on Cox7 Arizona after the two parties reached a two-year agreement. Cox7 will broadcast all of GCU's home games through the 2015-16 season which will be the Lopes' third in Division I.

The broadcast crew received an off-season shakeup, with former sideline reporter Barry Buetel shifting to the play-by-play duties.  Joining Buetel is three-time NBA champion Scott Williams on the analysis and Kyndra de St. Aubin as the new sideline reporter.  The broadcasts consist of a 30-minute pregame show and limited commercial advertising throughout, allowing for viewers to experience more of the in-arena atmosphere at Grand Canyon.

Roster

Schedule and results

|-
!colspan=12 style="background:#522D80; color:#FFFFFF;"| Exhibition

|-
!colspan=12 style="background:#522D80; color:#FFFFFF;"| Regular season

|-
!colspan=12 style="background:#522D80; color:#FFFFFF;"| CIT

References

Grand Canyon Antelopes men's basketball seasons
Grand Canyon
Grand Canyon